El Milia is a district in Jijel Province, Algeria. 

It was named after its capital, the town of El Milia.

Municipalities
The district is further divided into 2 municipalities:
El Milia
Ouled Yahia Khedrouche

 

Communes of Jijel Province